In modern usage, enthusiasm refers to intense enjoyment, interest, or approval expressed by a person. The term is related to playfulness, inventiveness, optimism and high energy. The word was originally used to refer to a person possessed by God, or someone who exhibited intense piety.

Historical usage

The word enthusiasm originates from the Greek ἐνθουσιασμός from ἐν (en, “in”) and θεός (theós, “god”) and οὐσία (ousía, “essence”), meaning "inspired by [a] god's essence". Applied by the Greeks to manifestations of divine possession, by Apollo (as in the case of the Pythia), or by Dionysus (as in the case of the Bacchantes and Maenads), the term enthusiasm was also used in a transferred or figurative sense. Socrates taught that the inspiration of poets is a form of enthusiasm. The term was confined to a belief in religious inspiration, or to intense religious fervor or emotion.

From this, a Syrian sect of the fourth century was known as the Enthusiasts. They believed that "by perpetual prayer, ascetic practices and contemplation, man could become inspired by the Holy Spirit, in spite of the ruling evil spirit, which the fall had given to him". From their belief in the efficacy of prayer, they were also known as Euchites.

Several Protestant Christian denominations that emerged in the 16th and 17th centuries, especially those who hold revivals, were called enthusiastic.

Pejorative use 
During the years that immediately followed the Glorious Revolution, "enthusiasm" was a British pejorative term for advocacy of any political or religious cause in public, i.e. fanaticism. Such "enthusiasm" was seen in the time around 1700 as the cause of the previous century's English Civil War and its attendant atrocities, and thus it was an absolute social sin to remind others of the war by engaging in enthusiasm. The Royal Society bylaws stipulated that any person discussing religion or politics at a Society meeting was to be summarily ejected for being an "enthusiast."

During the 18th century, popular Methodists such as John Wesley or George Whitefield were accused of blind enthusiasm, a charge against which they defended themselves by distinguishing fanaticism from "religion of the heart." Methodists who enthusiastically preach about and experience the new birth (first work of grace) and entire sanctification (second work of grace) often have emotional experiences.

See also
Artistic inspiration
Connoisseur
Emotional contagion
Entheogen
Euphoria
Fan (person)
Flow (psychology)
Motivation
Zest (positive psychology)

References

Further reading
 Ronald Knox. Enthusiasm: a Chapter in the History of Religion, with Special Reference to the XVII and XVIII Centuries. Oxford, Eng.: Oxford University Press, 1950. viii. 
 John Locke. An Essay Concerning Human Understanding. vol. 2. New York: Dover Publications
 Susie Tucker. Enthusiasm: A Study in Semantic Change. London: Cambridge University Press. 
 Joshua Grooms. Enthusiasm: A Study in Project Management. London: Cambridge University Press.

External links

David Hume, Of Superstition and Enthusiasm
The Ronald Knox Society of North America
The American Heritage Dictionary of the English Language: enthusiasm
John Wesley's Sermon, "The Nature of Enthusiasm"

Positive mental attitude
Emotions
Spirit possession